Nicole Avril (born 15 August 1939 in Rambouillet) is a French academic, actress, model, and writer.

Works

Novels
Dernière mise en scène (Plon et Pocket 2005)
Le Regard de la grenouille (Plon 2003, Pocket 2005)
Contes pour rêver (Piccolia 2001)
Le Roman du visage (Plon 2000)
Le Roman d’un inconnu (Grasset 1998)
Une Personne déplacée (Grasset 1996, LGF-Livre de Poche 1998)
Il y a longtemps que je t’aime (Flammarion 1991, J’ai Lu 1993)
Sur la peau du diable (Flammarion 1987, J'ai Lu 1989)
La Première alliance (Flammarion 1986, J'ai Lu 1987)
Jeanne (Flammarion 1984, J'ai Lu 1985)
La Disgrâce (Albin Michel 1980, J'ai Lu 1982)
Monsieur de Lyon (Albin Michel 1979, J'ai Lu 1980)
Le Jardin des absents (Albin Michel 1977 Livre de poche 1979)
Les Remparts d’Adrien (Albin Michel 1975), taken from a TV film she wrote
Les Gens de Misar (Albin Michel 1972), Prix des Quatre-Jurys
L’Eté de la Saint-Valentin (Pauvert 1972, Livre de poche 1975)

Others
Moi, Dora Maar (Plon 2002, Pocket 2003)
L’Impératrice (Grasset 1993, Livre de Poche 1995), fictionalized biography of Elisabeth of Austria, 
Dans les jardins de mon père (Flammarion 1989, J’ai Lu 1991), autobiographical story
Taisez-vous, Elkabbach ! (Flammarion, 1982), co-written with her husband Jean-Pierre Elkabbach

References

1939 births
Living people
People from Rambouillet
French women novelists
Writers from Île-de-France
French educators